Leanne Ratcliffe (Freelee the Bananagirl) is an Australian YouTube personality, vegan activist, speaker, and author. She is the creator of the YouTube channel Freelee The BananaGirl, where she talks about her diet, exercise and lifestyle. Her channel accumulated over 780 thousand subscribers and 330 million views.

Ratcliffe started her channel to keep a record of her progress and to spread awareness about her diet techniques. In one video, she recalls some of her previous career path choices. She was a bartender, a promoter for an alcohol brand, a snack vendor at a movie theater, a receptionist and for some time she also worked at McDonald's.
She gained online popularity in 2014 after promoting a controversial "extreme" vegan diet. In 2017, Ratcliffe moved to the jungle of Northern Queensland where she lives "off grid" with her partner, though some outlets mistakenly stated that she had moved to a South American jungle.

Popularity
Ratcliffe calls her diet "frugivorous," though this is a zoological term for species which thrive on a diet consisting mostly of fruit. Her dietary practices are more accurately described as "fruititarian, although she also includes starchy and non-vegetables, and small quantities of nuts and seeds ." Ratcliffe counters arguments against a high carbohydrate diet with examples of and references to the eating habits of the longest surviving Asian cultures. She maintains that a low fat and low salt diet is the key to effectively extracting nutrition from any kind of diet. It is worth noting that traditional Asian cuisine is typically higher in protein, fat, and salt than her suggested diet, with soy based protein, nuts, legumes, cooked cereal grains, seafood, eggs, modest amounts of poultry and pork often being included, as well as the use of heat. She has been featured in publications such as Men's Fitness, Huffington Post, Daily Mail and News.com.au.
Her YouTube channel is popular with around 780K+ subscribers and over 330 million views. She is also active on other social media platforms like Facebook, Instagram and Twitter where she has amassed a significant following.

Nickname
Freelee the Banana Girl draws her nickname from a combination of the word "Freedom," her first name, "Leanne," and her fruit of choice, bananas.

Controversy 
The fruitarian diet promoted by Ratcliffe is not considered advisable by many, if not all, mainstream nutritionists. Specifically, there are concerns that raw vegan diets which restrict nuts and seeds are too low in essential amino acids, fats, calcium, iodine, iron, and omega 3 fatty acids.

Ratcliffe has been known for controversial, and scientifically unsubstantiated claims.  After the death of teenage makeup guru, Talia Castellano (known as Taliajoy18 on YouTube), Ratcliffe published a video claiming that Castellano's death could have been prevented had she forgone chemotherapy in favor of a raw food vegan diet. Ratcliffe also claimed that chemotherapy was a dangerous, poisonous, and ineffective treatment for cancer.

Ratcliffe has claimed that amenorrhea (the absence of her period) for nine months was a sign that her body was healthy and had fewer "toxins" to flush out via menstruation. In reality, amenorrhea in women of child-bearing age is frequently a result of low body weight, poor nutrition, disordered eating, and other illnesses. Additionally, maintaining living conditions resulting in secondary amenorrhea may result in infertility and osteoporosis, which is not always reversible. There is no scientific evidence that menstruation is a way for the body to "flush out toxins."

Ratcliffe has made many controversial statements criticizing the appearances of critics, other YouTube personalities, and overweight people in general. Ratcliffe posted a video in which she stated that more deaths were caused in the 9/11 terrorist attacks because of "obese people" blocking the doors, not allowing "fit people" to pass through.

After the end of her relationship to fellow YouTube personality, Harley 'Durianrider' Johnstone, allegations emerged of physical abuse from both parties and emotional abuse on the part of Ratcliffe.

In late 2019, Freelee was criticized for a response video she made to Emma Chamberlain's "what I eat in a day" video. She criticized Chamberlain's coffee consumption and appearance, and in turn, received negative comments herself.

Books 
Ratcliffe has advertised her own self-published e-books outlining her diet principles under the titles, ‘Raw Till 4 Diet’, ‘Go Fruit Yourself’ and ‘My Naked Lunchbox’.  These books were met with the criticism that following her plans could lead to disordered eating, and nutritional deficiency, and that the diets are unbalanced and incredibly restrictive.

References

External links

Cookbook writers
Australian veganism activists
Women cookbook writers
Chefs of vegan cuisine
Women chefs
1980 births
Australian YouTubers
Living people
Pseudoscientific diet advocates
Raw foodists
21st-century Australian women
21st-century Australian people
21st-century Australian non-fiction writers
Australian women activists
Australian chefs
Lifestyle YouTubers